Marcos Sarfatti (born 26 April 1929) is an Argentine boxer. He competed in the men's welterweight event at the 1952 Summer Olympics.

References

External links
  

1929 births
Possibly living people
Argentine male boxers
Olympic boxers of Argentina
Boxers at the 1952 Summer Olympics
Place of birth missing (living people)
Welterweight boxers